Project Fame was a pan-African version of the international talent/reality show Star Academy. Held in Johannesburg, South Africa from June to August 2004, the show had 16 African contestants – 9 of which were South African – groomed for stardom, with the weakest being eliminated on a weekly basis; the top three received record deals and the winner got a lot more prizes.

The contestants were eliminated in the following way: the Board (judges) place four contestants on probation, the teachers save one, the other contestants save another and viewers save a third, thereby eliminating the last contestant. As the show progressed, the number of contestants placed on probation rose to five resulting in two contestants being eliminated. The last five remaining contestants' fates were determined by viewers' votes.

An East African version; Tusker Project Fame (season 1) began on 1 October – 17 December 2006. It continues to run each year and the latest is Tusker Project Fame season 4 which ended on 6 December 2010, and won by Ugandan Davis Hillary Ntare.

The show can be described as Idols meets Big Brother Africa as the contestants' daily activities were recorded 24 hours a day.

Final results

*These contestants performed better than their equally
ranked contestants as they were on probation less often.

Star Academy
South African reality television series
2004 South African television series debuts
2004 South African television series endings
2004 in South African television